O.H. Cooper High School (commonly referred to as Abilene Cooper) is a public high school located in Abilene, Texas. It opened in 1960, in part to handle the increase in school age youth resulting from the Post World War II Baby Boom. It is one of three 4-year high schools within Abilene Independent School District.

Cooper High is named for Oscar Henry Cooper, who was president of Baylor University from 1898 to 1902. Prior to such time, his advocacy for a state-supported and state-controlled university led to the establishment of the University of Texas. After his time at Baylor, Dr. Cooper was president of Hardin–Simmons University in Abilene until 1909. Thereafter, he headed "Cooper's Boys' School" in Abilene until 1915.

Faculty and academics

Abilene is the home of Dyess Air Force Base and Cooper students have benefited from retired officers, and spouses of officers, from Dyess becoming teachers at Cooper.  Retired US Air Force Colonel James Alderman, a mathematics and science teacher at the school, explained to his students that he worked on the development of the Gamma Ray Spectrometer and did research relating to nuclear fusion while in the United States Air Force.  Retired US Air Force Colonel James Zumwalt taught Honors Calculus and, in 1981–1982, was zoo keeper over his homeroom class that called itself the "Zoo."  Members of the Zoo included many of the top graduating students in 1982 and yet still managed to win the intramural sports championship.

In the years 1979 to 1982, Cooper consistently fielded teams for UIL competitions that finished in the top of their subject areas, including Speech, Creative Writing, Orchestra, Math, Band, and Choir.  Cooper graduates frequently were named as Scholars, Finalists, Semi-finalists, and Commended by the National Merit Scholarship Program.  Six members of the Class of 1982 received the Scholar designation.

Athletics

Volleyball
The Cooper High School Volleyball Team won the state 4A championship in 1967, defeating San Antonio Harlandale 15-0; 11-15; 15-7.

Golf
The Cooper High School Golf Team won the 5A State Championship in 1982, 1983, and 1984.

Bob Estes, Class of 1984, won the individual state title in 1983. As a collegiate golfer at the University of Texas, Bob was selected as an All-American, received the Jack Nicklaus award, and was named 1988 College Player of the Year.  Mike Standly, Class of 1982, played for the University of Houston, finished in second place to Scott Verplank at the 1986 NCAA championship, won his first tournament in 1993, the Freeport-McMoRan Classic in New Orleans, and can still be found on professional golf tours.

Tennis
The Cooper High School Tennis Team has made appearances at the Texas state competition 8 times in its history, ranking 5th in the state for all-time appearances in conference 5A. It competed in 1985, 1986, 1987, 1989, 1992 and won the championship for three consecutive years in 1993, 1994 and 1995.

Ricky Meyers won the state singles title in 1976 and Ryan Hughes did the same in 1995. David Meyers and Scott Meyers (identical twins) won boys doubles state in 1982. 

Jana Hanks won the state singles title in 1975 and 1976, Susie Ingram and Julie Jones won the state doubles title in 1976, and Leanne Hill and Stephanie Burnam won the state doubles title in 1982. 

As of November, 2009, The Cooper Tennis Team is ranked 8th in the state in conference 4A.

Tennis State Championships
Boys Singles
1976 – Ricky Meyers (4A)
1995 – Ryan Hughes (5A)
Boys Doubles
1982 – Scott & David Meyers (5A)
Girls Singles
1975 – Jana Hanks (4A)
1976 – Jana Hanks (4A)
Girls Doubles
1976 – Susie Ingram & Julie Jones (4A)
1982 – Leanna Hill & Stephanie Burnam (5A)
Team Championships 
1986 – lost to San Antonio Churchill High School 3-10
1987 – lost to Tyler Lee High School 6-9
1993 – def. Klein High School 9-2
1994 – def. Houston Clear Lake High School 15-3
1995 – def. Plano High School 9-3

Baseball
In the late 1970s and early 1980s, the team consistently finished near the top in District.  Baseball teams from Cooper have played in four state championship games, 1967, 1987, 1988, and 1993, winning the 5A state championship twice with consecutive wins in 1987 and 1988.  Consecutive championships have only been accomplished by 3 other schools in the history of Texas high school baseball (one being crosstown rival Abilene High School).

Baseball State Championship Appearances
 1967 – Lost to Corpus Christi King 0-1
 1987 – Defeated San Antonio MacArthur 13-3
 1988 – Defeated Round Rock Westwood 7-4
 1993 – Lost to Arlington Martin 0-8

Cooper players recognized in UIL records include Chris Feris and Robert McAdams in 1987 for Most Extra base hits (doubles) in tournament play, Chris Feris in 1987 for Most Hits in a Game (3), Philip Carpenter in 1988 for Most Hits in a Game (3) and Robert McAdams in 1987 for a .600 batting average in a two-game series with at least 5 at bats.

Gymnastics
Cooper, and AISD as a whole, has enjoyed notable success in Gymnastics state meets, with multiple State Titles for both individual and team performances.

Gymnastics Championships
Men
 1973 – Donovan Sparhawk(Parallel Bars)
 1975 – Steve Rutledge (Rings)
 1976 – Steve Rutledge (Rings)
 1978 – Larry Hanson (Floor)
 1979 – Team Champions: David Hardy (Floor), David Watson, (Parallel Bars), J.T. Fletcher (Pommels, Vault, High Bar, All-Around)
 1983 – Bobby Cluck (Pommels), David Henson (High Bar)
 1984 – David Henson (High Bar)
 1988 – Greg Joyner (Vault, High Bar)
 1989 – Chris Reese (Rings), Greg Joyner (Vault)
 1990 – Andrew Clamann (Pommels)
 1991 – Team Champions: Andrew Clamann (Pommels), Jimmy Chai Kong (Rings), Greg Clark (Parallel Bars)
 1992 – Team Champions: Landon King (Rings), Eddie Marentes (Parallel Bars)
 1993 – Landon King (Rings, Parallel Bars)
 2003 – Nate Dalo (Rings)
Women
 1978 – Cathy Cubine (Bars)
 1979 – Cathy Cubine (Beam, All-Around)
 1980 – Cathy Cubine (Bars, Floor, All-Around), Missy Urquhart (Vault)
 1981 – Missy Urquhart (Bars, Beam, Floor)

Swimming
In the late 1970s and early 1980s, the team consistently finished near the top in District.

Under the direction of Head Coach Casey Pacheco the women's team won their district championship meets in both 2015 and 2016. Many athletes then went on to compete at the regional level several placing quite high. In 2016 the men's team also won their district championship meet and sent athletes on to regionals. This particular season one male swimmer even went on to compete at the state level. The following year the swimming districts were rezoned and The team was placed in a more competitive district. Both team still had great showings though with the women taking second overall and the men taking third. This again meant that many athletes went on to compete at the regional level

Football

Professional Players
Dominic Rhodes and Justin Snow were members of the 2007 NFL champion Indianapolis Colts.

Ray Berry played for the Minnesota Vikings and Seattle Seahawks from 1987 to 1993

Terry Orr played for the Washington Redskins and San Diego Chargers  from 1986 to 1993

Appearances in the state championship game
With the exception of a few periods, the Cougars have been a team which contended for the district title. The teams of the mid 90s to the early 2000s were consistently in the playoffs.  The 1996 team featuring Dominic Rhodes made it to the state championship game, playing Austin Westlake led by quarterback Drew Brees. Randy Allen, Head Coach at Cooper from the 1991 season through the 1998 season , was named to the Texas High School Coaches Association's Hall of Honor in 2006.  History came full circle, as Coach Allen was on the 1967 team, the only other Cooper team to advance to the state finals to date.  The 1967 game was a thriller.  Due to a muffed extra point, Cougars lost by one point to then powerhouse Austin, Texas Reagan High School (Reagan went on to defeat Permian High School in the 1968 and 1970 state championship games) when the officials declined to rule a possible touchdown in favor of Cooper on the final play of the game.

District Championships
1967 – District 2-4A – District Record 7-0
1969 – District 3-4A – District Record 8-0
1971 – District 5-4A – District Record 6-1 (Shared with Odessa Permian)
1979 – District 5-4A – District Record 7-0
1993 – District 4-5A – District Record 5-1  (Shared with Midland Lee & Odessa High)
1997 – District 4-5A – District Record 6-0
1998 – District 4-5A – District Record 4-1  (Shared with Midland Lee & Odessa Permian)
2000 – District 4-5A – District Record 4-1  (Shared with Midland Lee)
2001 – District 4-5A – District Record 4-1  (Shared with Abilene High)
2002 – District 3-5A – District Record 5-0
2003 – District 3-5A – District Record 4-1
2009 – District 4-4A – District Record 5-0
2010 – District 3-5A – District Record 4-1  (Shared with Abilene High & Midland High)
2014 - District 4-5A − District Record 3-1  (Shared with Lubbock Cooper High School & Plainview High School)
2016 - District 4-5A − District Record 4-1  (Shared with Lubbock Coronado)
2020 - District 3-5A - District Record 6-0

Postseason performance

Bi-District
1967 – def. El Paso Burges 52-21
1969 – def. Amarillo Palo Duro 17-0
1971 – lost to Wichita Falls 21-34
1979 – lost to Lewisville 10-13
1992 – lost to Amarillo 17-20
1993 – def. Lubbock Monterey 27-13
1994 – def. Lubbock Monterey 28-10
1995 – def. Lubbock Coronado 31-7
1996 – def. Amarillo 20-14
1997 – def. Amarillo Tascosa 28-14
1998 – lost to Amarillo 11-36
1999 – lost to Amarillo 30-33
2000 – def. Amarillo 26-0
2001 – lost to Lubbock Monterey 21-28
2002 – def. Burleson 20-10
2003 – lost to DeSoto 20-27
2007 – lost to Mansfield Timberview 13-17
2008 – def. Canyon Randall 35-0
2009 – def. Dumas 52-14
2010 – def. Arlington Lamar 41-6
2011 - def. Arlington Lamar High School 27-24
2012 - def. Americas High School 40-21
2013 - def. Lubbock Coronado High School 49-14
2014 - lost to Canyon Randall 27-34
2015 - def. Amarillo Caprock High School 45-43
2016 - def. Dumas High School 37-14
2017 - def. Plainview High School 63-14

Area
1993 – def. El Paso Riverside 61-22
1994 – def. El Paso Eastwood 81-26
1995 – def. El Paso Irvin 19-13
1996 – def. El Paso Irvin 42-21
1997 – def. El Paso Socorro 50-8
2000 – def. El Paso Del Valle 44-22
2002 – def. Amarillo 35-24
2008 – def. El Paso Del Valle 56-10
2009 – def. El Paso Del Valle 51-41
2010 - def. Amarillo Tascosa High School 36-17
2011 - def. Amarillo High School 21-14
2012 - lost to Arlington High School 20-27
2013 - def. Arlington Lamar High School 45-24
2015 - def. Del Valle High School 31-14
2016 - def. Canutillo High School 55-23
2017 - def. Eastlake High School 42-21

Regional
1969 – def. El Paso Coronado 36-0
1993 – def. Haltom 41-6
1994 – lost to Arlington 39-42
1995 – lost to Flower Mound Marcus 7-41
1996 – def. Irving Nimitz 38-18
1997 – def. South Grand Prairie 36-20
2000 – def. Coppell 28-27
2002 – lost to Southlake Carroll 17-41
2008 – lost to Denton Guyer 7-28
2009 – lost to Denton Guyer 34-57
2010 – lost to Denton Guyer 7-55
2011 - lost to Mansfield Timberview High School 25-29
2013 - lost to Cedar Hill High School 23-28
2015 - lost to Aledo High School 0-33
2016 - lost to Aledo 35-56
2017 - lost to Aledo 31-34

Quarter-finals
1967 – def. Amarillo Tascosa 37-0
1969 – tied with Wichita Falls 0-0 (WF advanced on 1st downs)
1993 – lost to Lewisville 21-52
1996 – def. Flower Mound Marcus 37-19
1997 – lost to Flower Mound Marcus 14-38
2000 – lost to Arlington Lamar 28-34

Semi-finals
1967 – def. Richardson 42-6
1996 – def. Lake Highlands 24-21

Finals
1967 – lost to Austin Reagan 19-20
1996 – lost to Austin Westlake 15-55

Fine arts
Cooper enjoys a rich tradition of success in various branches of the fine and performing arts. 215 individuals have been named to the Texas All-State roster, with at least one Cooper student making All-State Choir, Band or Orchestra every year since 1971. Choir, Band, Orchestra, Art and Theater are all thriving on campus. One of Cooper's two feeder middle schools, Madison, has become the Abilene ISD magnet middle school for fine arts.

Band has a rich and proud history at Cooper High School. Often among the largest high school marching bands in Texas in the 1980s and 1990s, the band made frequent appearances at the State Marching Contest. The band marched in the 1990 Rose Parade, one of only a handful of Texas High School bands to have ever done so. The band is currently led by head director Clay Johnson, a former University of Oklahoma drum major who has directed the band since 2003, first as assistant for two years. Since 2005, three former Cooper Band members have been named drum major at Texas Tech University.

TMEA All-State Musicians
Cooper has had over 200 individuals be named to Texas All-State Bands, Choirs and Orchestras since 1971.

Band
 Piccolo – 4: 1994, 1995, 1996, 1999
 Flute – 10: 1975, 1976, 1977, 1986, 1987 (2), 1993, 1997, 2000, 2001
 Bb Clarinet – 15: 1985, 1986, 1987, 1990, 1991, 1992 (2), 1993, 1994 (2), 1995, 2001, 2002, 2004, 2005, 2012
 Bass Clarinet – 2: 1988, 2021
 Oboe – 5: 1975, 1976, 1977, 1996, 2023
 Bassoon – 3: 1972, 1974, 1975
 Alto Saxophone – 6: 1993, 2001, 2002, 2003, 2008, 2018
 Baritone Saxophone – 1: 2006
 Cornet/Trumpet – 8: 1986 (2), 1987, 1988, 1989, 1990, 1996, 2000
 Horn – 4: 1971, 1974, 2020, 2022
 Tenor Trombone – 14: 1986 (2), 1987 (2), 1988, 1989, 1992, 1995 (2), 1999, 2000, 2001, 2002, 2005
 Bass Trombone – 2: 1984, 1985
 Euphonium – 4: – 2001, 2004, 2006, 2008
 Tuba – 2: – 2009, 2010
 Percussion – 10: 1986, 1987, 1989, 1990, 1991, 1992, 1995, 1996, 2001, 2019, 2023
 Harp – 1: 1972

Choir
 Soprano 1 – 8: 1975, 1980, 1981, 1984, 1985, 1991, 1996, 2003
 Soprano 2 – 20: 1975 (2), 1976, 1979, 1980, 1984, 1989 (2), 1995, 1998, 1999 (2), 2001, 2002, 2003 (3), 2004, 2005
 Alto 1 – 18: 1972, 1974, 1975 (2), 1979, 1981, 1982, 1983, 1984 (3), 1989, 1992, 1996, 1997 (2), 1999, 2003
 Alto 2 – 13: 1975, 1979, 1980, 1982, 1984, 1988, 1989, 1991, 1992, 1993, 2001, 2005
 Tenor 1 – 12: 1974, 1975, 1976, 1979, 1980, 1981, 1982, 1983, 1985, 1988, 1989, 1995
 Tenor 2 – 16: 1974, 1977, 1979, 1981, 1982, 1984, 1985, 1986, 1990, 1991, 1992 (2), 1993 (2), 2004, 2005, 2011
 Bass 1 – 11: 1977, 1982, 1985 (2), 1986, 1988, 1989, 1994, 2002, 2004 (2)
 Bass 2 – 10: 1974, 1975, 1976, 1977 (2), 1985, 1986, 1990, 1994, 1995

Orchestra
 Oboe - 1: 1974
 Violin 1 – 4: 1972, 1974, 1993, 1994
 Violin 2 – 2: 1973, 1974
 Cello – 5: 1972, 1976, 1977, 1978, 1990
 String Bass – 7: 1986, 1987, 1988, 1989, 1990, 1999, 2001

Notable alumni
 Cory Aldridge, professional baseball player
 Randy Allen, Highland Park football coach
 Ray Berry, professional football player
 Bob Estes, professional golfer
 Jeff Ireland, former General Manager of the Miami Dolphins
 Dave Johnson, former professional baseball player
 Dowell Loggains, assistant coach, Chicago Bears, Tennessee Titans
 Jack Mildren, professional football player, Lieutenant Governor of Oklahoma
 Terry Orr, professional football player
 Andrae Patterson, professional basketball player
 Dominic Rhodes, professional football player
 Justin Snow, professional football player
 Rawson Stovall, video game producer, author, and first nationally-syndicated reviewer of video games
 Steven Stucky, Pulitzer Prize-winning classical composer
 Bernie Tiede, convicted murderer, subject of movie Bernie
 Robert Sloan, former president, Baylor University

References

External links
 Cooper HS Website

See also
Jack Mildren
Forest Park High School (Beaumont, Texas)
Post World War II Baby Boom
Buzz Bissinger
Friday Night Lights (film)
Permian High School

Abilene Independent School District
High schools in Taylor County, Texas
Public high schools in Texas